Bollywed is a Canadian documentary television series, which premiered in January 2023 on CBC Television. The series profiles Chandan Fashion, a family-owned bridal shop in Toronto's Little India neighbourhood which specializes in traditional Indian bridal wear.

One episode of the series features an appearance by Mark "Priyanka" Suknanan, the first season winner of Canada's Drag Race, as he shops for a new outfit for his upcoming world tour. 

The series debuted on January 12, 2023.

References

External links

2023 Canadian television series debuts
2020s Canadian documentary television series
CBC Television original programming
Indo-Canadian culture